Lawler may refer to:

People:
Lawler (surname)

Places:
Lawler, Illinois
Lawler, Iowa
Lawler, Minnesota

See also
 Lawlers (disambiguation)
 Lawlor (disambiguation)